White dog or White Dog may refer to:

White Dog (Gary novel), a novel by Romain Gary
White Dog (Temple novel), a novel by Peter Temple
White Dog (1982 film), a 1982 film by Samuel Fuller
White Dog (2022 film), a 2022 film adaptation by Anaïs Barbeau-Lavalette of the Gary novel
A dog with a white coat of fur
White dog, the unaged spirit distilled from fermented mash in bourbon production
Whitedog, Ontario, Canada

See also
White Dawg (born Billy Alsbrooks, Jr., 1974), American rapper